Steve Darrell (born Darryl Eugene Horsfall, November 19, 1904 – August 14, 1970) was an American actor.

Darrell was born in Osage in Mitchell County in northern Iowa.

Darrell's career began in 1931 when he acted with the Trousdale Players in Des Moines, Iowa.

He was cast as the wise Comanche chief Little Elk in the 1958 episode "Renegades" of Cheyenne.

Darrell died from a brain tumor in Hollywood, California. He is buried at Westwood Village Memorial Park Cemetery.

Partial filmography
 Code of the Secret Service (1939)
 Nothing but Trouble (1944)
 Heldorado (1946)
 Roll on Texas Moon (1946)
 Terrors on Horseback (1946)
 Lightning Raiders (1946)
 Gentlemen with Guns (1946)
 On the Old Spanish Trail (1947)
 Prairie Express (1947)
 Trailing Danger (1947)
 Valley of Fear (1947)
 Adventures of Frank and Jesse James (1948)
 Carson City Raiders (1948)
 I Wouldn't Be in Your Shoes (1948)
 Night Time in Nevada (1948)
 Partners of the Sunset (1948)
 Abandoned (1949)
 Riders in the Sky (1949)
 The Blazing Trail (1949)
 The Blazing Sun (1950)
 Cow Town (1950)
 Pecos River (1951)
 Jack Slade (1953)
 Dangerous Mission (1954)
 Tarantula (1955)
 The Tall Men (1955) as Colonel Norris, U.S. Cavalry
 Treasure of Ruby Hills (1955)
 The Monolith Monsters (1957)

References

External links
 

1904 births
1970 deaths
People from Osage, Iowa
20th-century American male actors
American male television actors
American male film actors
Male actors from Iowa
Male actors from Los Angeles
Burials at Westwood Village Memorial Park Cemetery
Deaths from brain cancer in the United States